Bandamax is a 24-hour cable television music channel owned by TelevisaUnivision Mexico under Televisa Networks. It is available in Mexico, United States, and Latin America. It focuses on Regional Mexican music; in addition to banda music, its playlist includes mariachi and norteño, among others.

History 
Bandamax was released on December 1, 1996. In the beginning, the channel had its own programs. However, in late 1998, its programming became automated in music videos.
In November 2003, the channel was officially launched in the United States. Two years later, in 2005, at the request of the channel's audience, Bandamax again incorporated original production programs.

External links
 Webpage
 Televisa Networks

Latin American cable television networks
Televisa pay television networks
Television channels and stations established in 1996
Music television channels
Television networks in Mexico